Dixieland Plus is Harry Connick Jr.'s debut album, recorded Live in New Orleans, Louisiana on Oct. 29-30, 1977, with a local Dixieland band. He was age 10 at the time of the recording and was simultaneously studying with local piano masters Ellis Marsalis and James Booker.

Track listing

Musicians
Harry Connick Jr. – piano; vocal at "St. James Infirmary" and "When The Saints Go Marching In"
Roy Liberto – trumpet
Pee Wee Spitelera, clarinet
Jim Duggan – trombone
Freddie Kohlman – drums
Placide Adams – string bass

References

1977 debut albums
Harry Connick Jr. albums